Koolau Range is a name given to the dormant fragmented remnant of the eastern or windward  shield volcano of the Hawaiian island of Oahu.   It was designated a National Natural Landmark in 1972.

Geology
It is not a [mountain range] in the normal sense, because it was formed as a single mountain called Koolau Volcano (koolau means "windward" in Hawaiian, cognate of the toponym Tokelau). What remains of Koolau is the western half of the original volcano that was destroyed in prehistoric times when the entire eastern half—including much of the summit caldera—slid cataclysmically into the Pacific Ocean. Kāneʻohe Bay is what remains of the ancient volcano's summit caldera after the slide. The modern Koolau mountain forms Oahu's windward coast and rises behind the leeward coast city of Honolulu — on its leeward slopes and valleys are located most of Honolulu's residential neighborhoods.

The volcano is thought to have first erupted on the ocean floor more than 2.5 million years ago. It eventually reached sea level and continued to grow in elevation until about 1.7 million years ago, when the volcano became dormant. The volcano remained dormant for hundreds of thousands of years, during which time erosion ate away at the initially smooth slopes of the shield-shaped mountain; and the entire mass subsided considerably. The highest elevation perhaps exceeded ; today, the summit of the tallest peak, Puu Kōnāhuanui is only .

Honolulu Volcanics

After hundreds of thousands of years of dormancy, Koolau volcano began to erupt again.  Some thirty eruptions over the past 500,000 years or so have created many of the landmarks around eastern Oahu, such as Diamond Head, Koko Head (Hanauma Bay), Koko Crater, Punchbowl Crater, Tantalus, and Āliapaakai, and are collectively known as the Honolulu Volcanic Series, or simply Honolulu Volcanics. According to the US Geological Survey, the most recent eruptions in this series of activity occurred between about 70,000 to 100,000 years ago. There is a possibility that Koolau volcano could erupt again; however, the chance of such an eruption occurring in "our lifetimes, or even those of many future generations" is remote.

History
The Ko‘olau Range is the erosion of remnants of a massive shield volcano, but estimates show evidence that it erupted approximately 2.5 million years ago. 

Though during the ancient period, the Ko‘olau Range became a sacred area for the Native Hawaiians. In 1795, the newly-formed Hawaiian Kingdom conducted a battle resulting in the triumphant conquest of O'ahu on the range within part of the Nu‘uanu Pali Lookout, under the command of Kamehameha the Great, as his troops forced all of the warriors up the valley to fall to their deaths below the cliffs.

The Ko‘olau Range was designated in 1972 as a National Natural Landmark.

Transportation
There are three roads that tunnel through the southern part of the Koolau Range, connecting Honolulu to the Windward Coast. From leeward to windward:
 Hawaii Route 61 (Pali Highway)
 Hawaii Route 63 (Likelike Highway)
 Interstate H-3

Gallery

References

External links
 

Volcanoes of Oahu
Extinct volcanoes
Mountains of Hawaii
National Natural Landmarks in Hawaii
Polygenetic shield volcanoes
Pliocene shield volcanoes
Pleistocene shield volcanoes
Neogene Oceania
Pleistocene Oceania
Cenozoic Hawaii